Ram Kand Mool is a drum-shaped tuber mainly found in Indian states of Karnataka, Andhra Pradesh, Telangana and Maharashtra. It is the lesser-known variety of tuber and root-fruit, commonly called kand mool, Ramkand and Rama Chandra Kandmool in the northern part of India and Boomi sakkarai Valli Kizhangu in the Indian state of Tamil Nadu. Even though its identity is mysterious, it is believed to be the flowering stalk of Century plant (Agave Sisalana or Sisal) via research.

History

Mythology 
According to legends, Ram kand mool was consumed by Lord Rama, his wife Sita, and his brother Lakshmana during their exile in the forest.

Research 
In the 1980s, the Indian botanists unsuccessfully tried to find more information on Ramkand. Later in 1994, the Shivaji University, Kolhapur resorted to DNA fingerprinting to identify Ramkand plant and concluded that it is a variety of Agave Americana. The anatomical study showed the plant is a typical monocotyledonous vascular bundle arrangement. However, this added more confusion, as monocots have adventitious roots and not a tap root system.

Hence, to find out the source, the plant material was obtained from a vendor from Jyotiba Temple in Kolhapur district, Maharashtra. The slices of approximately 4.5 inches radius and 2–3 mm breadth were brought to the laboratory and DNA was extracted from slices of Ram Kand Mool. Its purity was searched on agarose gel. The plastid locus for maturase k was selected to identify the plant species. The similarity search revealed 89 per cent identity with the partial sequence of the plastid locus maturase of Agave sisalana.

Consumption 

It can be found during summer. It is served as thinly cut slices as a street snack, wrapped in leaves or papers. It is seasoned with honey, palm sugar, lime, salt and chilli powder. Vendors selling Ram Kand Mool usually claim that consuming it can cool your stomach and satisfy your thirst. It is eaten raw. Ram Kand Mool is a starch-rich tuber and has health benefits. Some people consume Ramkand in powdered form as part of traditional medicines.

References 

Tubers
Agave
Sisal
Fruits originating in Asia
Edible fruits
Root vegetables
Street food in India
Indian snack foods